Omar Mendoza Martínez (born October 28, 1988, in Tula de Allende, Hidalgo) is a Mexican former professional footballer who last played for Atlético Zacatepec.

External links

Ascenso MX 

1988 births
Living people
Footballers from Hidalgo (state)
Association footballers not categorized by position
21st-century Mexican people
Mexican footballers